= Flytunes =

Internet Service

Flytunes LLC
- Founded: 2007; 19 years ago
- Headquarters: Phoenix, Arizona
- Area served: Worldwide
- Owner: Sachin Khanna
- Founder: Roy Smith
- CEO: Roy Smith
- Industry: Internet Radio
- Website: flytunes.fm

Flytunes LLC was an Internet radio aggregator service founded by Roy Smith. It was developed for iPhone and iPod Touch and displays a list of Internet radio stations.

== Partnership ==
On April 14, 2008, Flytunes LLC. CEO Sam Abadir announced in a press release that they will be partnering with Accuradio and it will bring more than 320+ radio channels to iPhone and iPod.

== Current status ==
Flytunes LLC was acquired by RankBeetle on March 19, 2018. and the domain flytunes.fm redirects to Wheon website. and now its a subsidiary of RankBeetle LLC.
